Eupogonius bierigi is a species of beetle in the family Cerambycidae. It was described by Melzer in 1933. It is known from Cuba.

References

Eupogonius
Beetles described in 1933
Endemic fauna of Cuba